The discography of Dashboard Confessional, an American rock band, consists of seven studio albums, one live album, one compilation album, six extended plays and 13 singles.

Albums

Studio albums

Live albums

Compilation albums

EPs

Singles

Other appearances

References

Dashboard Confessional albums
Dashboard Confessional songs
Discographies of American artists
Alternative rock discographies